Palasport Lino Oldrini, known as Enerxenia Arena for sponsorship reasons, is an indoor sporting arena that is located in Varese, Italy. The seating capacity of the arena is 5,300 people for basketball games.

History
The arena hosted the 1970 FIBA Intercontinental Cup basketball tournament. It is currently the home arena of the Italian League professional basketball club Pallacanestro Varese.

See also
 List of indoor arenas in Italy

References

External links

Official site

Indoor arenas in Italy
Basketball venues in Italy
1964 establishments in Italy
Sports venues completed in 1964